Nataniël le Roux (born 30 August 1962), better known as Nataniël, is a South African singer, songwriter, entertainer and best-selling author. He is best known for his solo stage act and his lifestyle and cooking TV shows.

Career 
Nataniël le Roux launched his career in 1987 with the release of his first single, Maybe Time. Since then he has released fifteen studio- and two live- albums, staged more than eighty original theatre productions and published twenty-one books. In 1997 he also released a four-track EP entitled The Diva Divine with opera singer Mimi Coertse. His many theatre shows, often staged at the Johannesburg casino Emperor's Palace, have won him multiple awards.

Nataniël manages a company specialising in lifestyle goods called Kaalkop, which means "bald" in Afrikaans, but implies "honest" or "unpretentious".

After starring in the TV series Another Life With Nataniël (1998-1999) and Project Fame (2004), Nataniël created and hosted Die Nataniël Tafel, a cooking and entertainment program in five seasons (2012-2014), on the South African television channel kykNET. In 2014 he starred in the South African TV drama Almon, Henry which he also wrote. In recent years he has created and hosted five seasons of his TV show Edik van Nantes (2015–2020) on the same channel alongside his brother, Erik le Roux.

During live musical performances, he is often accompanied on stage by Steinway pianist Charl du Plessis, or the Charl du Plessis Trio.

Nataniël has been a column writer for Sarie magazine since 2002, and has recently published the first part of his memoirs.

Discography

Studio albums

Live albums 

 2014: Moodswing (Nataniël on Stage)
 2013: Factory (live at Emperors Palace)

Compilation albums 

 2009: Act Two
 2006: Act One

Singles and EPs 

 1987: Maybe Time (Single)
 1988: One Life (Single)
 1997: The Diva Divine, with Mimi Coertse (EP)
 1998: Gossip Tower (Single)
 1999: In Ev’ry Star (Single)
 2003: Santa Maria (Single)
 2004: Gold (Single)
 2005: Diamond (Single)
 2019: 100 Years (Single)

Music videos

Literature

Memoirs 

 2019: Look At Me 
 2019: Kyk Na My

Story books

Cookbooks 

 2018: Die Edik van Nantes Kookboek, by Nataniël and Erik le Roux, 
 2015: Die Huis van Rye 
 2009: Gatherings 
 2001: Food from the White House 
 1996: Die Nataniël Kombuis 
 1994: Nataniël Kook

References

External links
 

1962 births
Living people
South African pop singers
South African entertainers
South African writers
South African musicians
South African television personalities